The 1963–64 DDR-Oberliga season was the 16th season of the DDR-Oberliga, the top level of ice hockey in East Germany. Six teams participated in the league, and SG Dynamo Weißwasser won the championship.

Regular season

References

External links
East German results 1949-1970

Ger
DDR-Oberliga (ice hockey) seasons
1963 in East German sport
1964 in East German sport
Ober